Tareq Khouri (1 December 1967 in Amman) is a Jordanian businessman and former president of Al-Wehdat SC and he is a deputy to the Parliament of Jordan.

Footnotes

1967 births
Living people
Jordanian people of Palestinian descent
Palestinian businesspeople
Jordanian businesspeople
People from Amman
Al-Wehdat SC
Jordanian Christians